Kohler High School is a public high school located in Kohler, Wisconsin. It serves grades 9-12 and is part of the Kohler School District. Kohler Elementary and Kohler Middle Schools are also based out of the same building, though the enrollments of each school are broken out individually rather than as one K-12 unit. In the same building is the Kohler Public Library, which serves as the school library for all three schools.

Athletics
Kohler High School participates in athletics as a member of the Big East Conference. Their athletic teams are known as the Bombers. The football team, due to a light enrollment, competes as a combined team with students from Sheboygan Area Lutheran High School and Sheboygan County Christian High School

References

External links
Kohler High School

Public high schools in Wisconsin
Schools in Sheboygan County, Wisconsin